Ahmed Hassan Mekky (born 20 April 1987) is an Egyptian footballer. He currently plays as a striker for the Egyptian club El Gouna FC on loan from Zamalek SC.

Club career

Haras El-Hodood
Mekki joined Haras El-Hodood in 2006. He is a versatile striker who has scored 44 goals in 94 matches for Haras Al Hoodood first team since joining them on 1 July 2007.

Mekki stated that he hoped to be allowed to sign for German side VFB Stuttgart, but his club refused to release him.

Zamalek SC
Mekki signed a 4-year contract with Zamalek SC on 28 July 2015, he made his debut on 18 August 2015, he scored the winning penalty against Al Ittihad in the Quarterfinals of the 2015 Egypt Cup, giving Zamalek their seat in Semifinals.

International career
Mekki was selected for the Egypt national squad for the first time in a match against Congo in 2010.

International goals
Correct as of 8 June 2015

Honors

Club
Haras El-Hodood
Egypt Cup: 2008-09, 2009-10
Egypt Super Cup: 2009

Zamalek SC
Egypt Cup: 2014-15

References

External links

Egyptian footballers
Living people
1987 births
Egypt international footballers
Haras El Hodoud SC players
Zamalek SC players
Smouha SC players
El Gouna FC players
Egyptian Premier League players
Association football forwards